"Ordinary People" is a song by the British singer-songwriter Steve Harley, which was released as a non-album single in 2015. It was written by Harley, Jim Cregan and Robert Hart, and produced by Harley. The song was Harley's first new song of five years, following the release of his fifth solo studio album Stranger Comes to Town in 2010.

Background
"Ordinary People" was originally written and performed by Jim Cregan and Robert Hart as a demoed track, who handed the recording to Harley in 2010. Although Harley did nothing with the song for five years, in 2015, he gained the support of Cregan and Hart to develop the song further. The song, in an early incarnation, was first performed live by Steve Harley & Cockney Rebel during their Autumn/Winter 2014 tour at the York Barbican on 13 December. During this airing, Harley revealed the song was a "work in progress". The next performance of the song live was at Hull City Hall on 26 February 2015. In an online diary entry, dated 13 January, Harley noted: "Next show: Hull City Hall – complete with new song. Well, the same new song we played at York Barbican, but with a twist. I said it was a work in progress, and now it has a separate section, a middle eight."

In June 2015, Harley spent several days in the Shrubbery Studio at Bury St Edmunds, Suffolk, recording "Ordinary People". Harley used his touring band Cockney Rebel to record the song, while the studio's owner Richard Clark engineered it. The song was bassist Marty Prior's debut performance on a Steve Harley song, having joined the band in 2014. During the sessions, assistant engineer George Perks had posted a photograph to his official website, and announced: "Honoured to be in the Shrubbery studio this month with Steve Harley & Cockney Rebel, assisting the recording of "Ordinary People". The new single sounds great, and has been sent over to producer extraordinaire Matt Butler for mixing. I'm really excited to hear the final mix! Stay tuned...!" It was announced that month that the song would be released as a single nearer the time of the upcoming The Best Years of Our Lives tour in November. Harley hoped that the song would gain airplay on UK radio and act as a publicity boost for the tour.

In Harley's online diary entry for 22 June, he wrote: "We spent a few days in a recording studio recently, and "Ordinary People" came out sounding like a potential R2 play-lister... if only! I've added an extra 12 bars of new melody and lyric (a Middle 8, which is actually 12)." It was also revealed that the digital recording files had been sent via Ethernet to Matt Butler, who would re-mix the song using Pro-tools. The single's release was first announced outside of the official website in the Southend Echo on 15 July, with the article noting that the single was still in the process of being remixed and prepared for release at that time.

During an interview on the BBC Radio 2 show Steve Wright in the Afternoon, in November 2015, Harley explained how the song was developed: 

In an interview with Phoenix FM, backstage at the Brentwood Music Festival in July 2015, Harley also spoke of the song's development: 

The song has been described by Harley as "Beatle-esque". Speaking to Classic Rock in October 2015, Harley revealed: "It's a cri de coeur – I'm speaking for the little man, as it were. It's not John Lennon, but as I get older I'm not ashamed to wear my heart on my sleeve." Speaking of the song's chances of getting airplay on BBC Radio 2, he added: "The new single from Cliff Richard is on the A-list, and they play David Gilmour, but it's tough. I'd love it if Radio 2 played my single – half the world and its grandmother thinks I only wrote one song. If it had the right name stuck to it I think they would play it."

Speaking to the East Anglian Daily Times in November 2015, Harley spoke of the song and its release:

Release
"Ordinary People" was made available as a pre-order digital single on 5 September 2015. It was released on 25 September. The song was not given a full commercial release on any physical format. The single's artwork features a close-up photograph of Harley, taken by Mike Callow.

A promotional one-track CD release of the single was later issued with an "impact" date of 27 November, specifically for radio station use. As an exclusive for radio, the promotional CD features a "Radio Edit" version of the song, which has a shortened introduction and first verse, and is approximately 20 seconds shorter than the full version. The CD features the same artwork as the digital version for a picture sleeve, housed in a plastic wallet, with a record company information sticker placed on the rear side. The physical format release was limited to 150 copies, and was issued by Comeuppance Ltd and promoted by All About Promotions.

The song was given its first play on 3 October, on BBC Radio Scotland's Billy Sloan Show. On 8 October, it received its first play on the Norwegian Oslo Radio, and on 21 October, it had its first BBC Radio 2 airing on Vanessa Feltz's show, followed with a play on Steve Wright in the Afternoon on 9 November.

On 7 November 2015, an official video of the song being performed live was uploaded onto YouTube. The footage was recorded during the Steve Harley & Cockney Rebel tour of that same month.

Critical reception
Upon release, Andrew Thomas of The Westmorland Gazette reviewed the single, describing the song as "deceptively simple" and "of the type that you need years of experience to pull off so well". He commented on the "Beatles/George Harrison feel", Harley's "rich and assured vocals" and the "straightforward but heartfelt lyrics - a plea for ordinary people to band together and show their essential humanity to try to make the world a better place". He concluded "Ordinary People" was "a very mature song which grows on you with each listen".

Reviewing the band's November 2015 concert at Scunthorpe Baths Hall, Scunthorpe Telegraph noted the song's inclusion within the set-list, commenting how "at the age of 64, Steve is still making great music". Another similar review on the band's Liverpool Philharmonic show, for the Wirral Globe, saw reporter Peter Grant comment: "We were treated to "Ordinary People" – Steve's new single which is, he says, unashamedly Beatle-esque".

When giving the song its first play on BBC Radio Scotland, Billy Sloan commented: "There's a brand new song which I think really is a fantastic piece of work, and I hope you agree. One of Steve Harley's best vocals in a long-long time, and that really is saying something when you consider his incredible back-catalogue". After playing the song on his BBC Radio 2 show, presenter Steve Wright commented that the song was "highly familiar", and that it "really does sound like a song I've heard before". After being played on Oslo Radio, the song received positive feedback from listeners.

Track listing
Digital Single
"Ordinary People" - 3:59

Promotional CD Single
"Ordinary People (Radio Edit)" - 3:37

Personnel
 Steve Harley – lead vocal, acoustic guitar, producer
 Barry Wickens – violin, acoustic guitar, backing vocals
 Robbie Gladwell – guitar, acoustic guitar, backing vocals
 James Lascelles – piano, organ, percussion, backing vocals
 Marty Prior – bass guitar
 Adam Houghton – drums

Additional personnel
 Richard Clark – engineer
 George Perks – assistant engineer
 Matt Butler – re-mixing on Pro-tools
 Mike Callow – photography

References

2015 singles
Songs written by Jim Cregan
Songs written by Steve Harley
Steve Harley songs
2015 songs